Causeway Coast and Glens is a local government district covering most of the northern part of Northern Ireland. It was created on 1 April 2015 by merging the Borough of Ballymoney, the Borough of Coleraine, the Borough of Limavady and the District of Moyle. The local authority is Causeway Coast and Glens Borough Council.

Geography
The district covers most of the northern part of Northern Ireland; an area totalling 1796 km2 spanning parts of Counties Antrim and Londonderry. The name of the new district was announced on 17 September 2008 as 'Causeway Coast' and was revised in February 2009.

Northern Ireland Railways stations
Bellarena station
Castlerock station
Coleraine station
Ballymoney
University station
Dhu Varren station
Portrush station

Rail services
Northern Ireland Railways provides services on the Belfast-Derry railway line between Londonderry station in the west and east to Belfast Lanyon Place station and Belfast Great Victoria Street station.

The Coleraine-Portrush line provides a service from the interchange at Coleraine station at the south of the branch with Portrush station the station terminal at the north of the branch line.

Giant's Causeway and Bushmills Railway
The Giant's Causeway and Bushmills Railway is a heritage railway and major tourist attraction.

Coastal physical geography
The area stretches around from the River Roe near Bellarena on the shores of Lough Foyle, with Magilligan Point with Benone Strand on the Atlantic Ocean, and Mussenden Temple perched on the cliffs to Castlerock.  At Castlerock the first of the seaside resorts the estuary of the River Bann is reached with crossing points located upstream at Coleraine.  From the River Bann the coast includes seaside resorts of Portstewart and Portrush.  Further along there is Dunluce Castle, Portballintrae and the town of Bushmills.  Whilst Bushmills (home to the world's oldest licensed distillery which has produced the famous Irish whiskey "Bushmills" since 1608).  The River Bush is crossed beside the Giant's Causeway and Bushmills Railway, and the Giant's Causeway is nearby.  The next place are Ballintoy, and onwards to Ballycastle

The area is popular with tourists and includes some of the best-known physical features of Northern Ireland: the Giant's Causeway (a World Heritage Site), the Glens of Antrim and Rathlin Island, which lies 7 miles off Ballycastle. The coast includes Carrick-a-Rede Rope Bridge and the small Dunseverick Castle, and the more isolated seaside resort of Ballycastle, with a ferry to Rathlin Island across the Straits of Moyle.  From Ballycastle the coastline veers southwards around Fair Head and continues with the North Channel and the settlements of Cushendun, then Cushendall and finally Waterfoot.

Causeway Coast and Glens District Council

Causeway Coast and Glens District Council replaced Ballymoney Borough Council, Coleraine Borough Council, Limavady Borough Council and Moyle District Council. The first election for the new district was originally due to take place in May 2009, but on April 25, 2008, Shaun Woodward, Secretary of State for Northern Ireland announced that the scheduled 2009 district council elections were to be postponed until 2011. The first elections took place on 22 May 2014 and the council acted as a shadow authority until 1 April 2015.

Settlements

Towns and villages
Armoy
Ballintoy
Ballycastle
Ballymoney
Bellarena
Bushmills
Castlerock
Cushendall
Cushendun
Coleraine
Dervock
Downhill
Drumsurn

Dunloy
Limavady
Magilligan
Portballintrae
Portrush
Portstewart
Rasharkin
Waterfoot

Freedom of the Borough
The following people, military units, organisations and groups have received the Freedom of the Borough of Causeway Coast and Glens.

Individuals
 Professor Gerry McKenna DL MRIA, biologist, academic administrator: 3 February 2001. 
 Alan Campbell: 8 December 2017.
 Richard Chambers: 8 December 2017.
 Peter Chambers: 28 December 2017.
 Mervyn Whyte : 2 February 2018.
 Mrs. Joan Christie : 11 May 2018.

Military Units
 152 (Ulster) Transport Regiment, RLC: 25 October 2008.
 206 (Ulster) Battery, Royal Artillery (Volunteers): 2015.
 The Royal Air Force: 8 April 2022.

Organisations and Groups
 Salvation Army and St Vincent de Paul: 2004 
 The Royal Portrush Golf Club: 21 May 2021.

See also
 Local government in Northern Ireland

References

Districts of Northern Ireland, 2015-present